"Keep Your Heart Broken" is a song by the Finnish alternative rock band The Rasmus, and the ninth track of their 2005 album Hide from the Sun. It was written by lead-singer Lauri Ylönen.

"Keep Your Heart Broken" was a popular song on the radio during the summer of 2006. It was also released as a radio single in the Nordic countries on August 7, 2006 and is also available to download online. The cover features the band's logo in black on a beige colored background with the song's name in the typical Trebuchet MS font.

Track listing

Personnel
 Lauri Ylönen – vocals
 Pauli Rantasalmi – guitar
 Eero Heinonen – bass
 Aki Hakala – drums

References

External links
 Lyrics

The Rasmus songs
2005 songs
Songs written by Lauri Ylönen